Anthony Griffiths may refer to: 

Antony Griffiths (born 1951), English art historian and curator of prints
Anthony Griffith (footballer) (born 1986), English-born footballer for Montserrat
Anthony Griffith (actor), American actor and comedian